Aljish is a village in the city of Qatif, in the Eastern Province of Saudi Arabia. The most important places in Aljish are prince Naif sport city, Qatif General Hospital and Qatif Iskan (housing complex). The village has a sport club called Alhidaya (الهداية). On the southern side of Aljish are the farms that divide between it and Saihat city.

Geography of Saudi Arabia